Icarus (stylized known on-screen as Dolph Lundgren is The Killing Machine) is a 2010 Canadian action film starring and directed by Dolph Lundgren in his last directorial effort until 2021. The film co-stars David Lewis, Samantha Ferris, and Bo Svenson. The film centers around Edward Genn, a former Soviet hitman known as "Icarus". After the collapse of the Soviet Empire, he moved to the United States to begin a new life. But after many years, his past has finally caught up with him.

On August 8, 2008, Lundgren signed a contract with Insight Film Studios to direct and star in Icarus. Produced on a $6 million budget, and filming began in October 2008 in Vancouver, British Columbia, Canada. Filming was expected to last "about" five weeks, but reportedly wrapped after 18 days.

At the 2008 Cannes Film Market, CineTel Films acquired the international distribution rights to the film. The worldwide premiere took place on Canadian television. This was followed by a limited theatrical release in a number of countries, including: the United States (on September 10, 2010), the United Arab Emirates (on October 28), Bahrain (on November 25), Oman (on December 2), and Kuwait (on December 16). The film received mixed reviews; praise was aimed at the action scenes and violence. On August 16, 2010, the film was distributed on Blu-ray and DVD in the United Kingdom by Anchor Bay Films, followed by the United States on October 19.

Plot

There were those who called him Icarus. Everyone else knew him as a divorced father working for an investment company. But they did not know his other side his dark side. Because Icarus (Dolph Lundgren) was at his best when he was killing people. For years, he had worked as a sleeper agent in America but when the Soviet Empire collapsed, he found himself in a foreign country with no one to trust.

Determined to break from his dark past, he started over with a new identity, but was only able to escape his past for so long. When a sudden mishap in Hong Kong blows Icarus' identity, past and present collide and the assassin realizes he is now the target. The people that want him dead will stop at nothing to get to him. And that means going after what he cares about most his wife and daughter.

Fighting for his life, Icarus is forced to face the demons of his past to protect the loved ones in his present. He must fight to save the only thing he has ever done right in his life. He needs to uncover who is after him and protect his family, before it is too late.

Cast

 Dolph Lundgren as Edward "Eddie" Genn / Icarus
 David Lewis as Mr. Graham
 Samantha Ferris as Kerr
 Bo Svenson as Vadim Voroshilov
 Stefanie von Pfetten as Joey (credited as Stefanie Von Pfetten)
 Lindsay Maxwell as April
 John Tench as Serge
 Katelyn Mager as Taylor
 Monique Ganderton as Kim

The film also stars Slavi Slavov as Oleg; Stephen Chang as John (credited as Stephen M.D. Chang), a Chinese crime boss; Igor Morozov as a Russian officer; Mike Carpenter and Marian Koprada, portraying younger versions of Icarus and Vadim; and Dan Payne and Chantal Forde in minor roles as Dave and Janet.

Production

Casting
On August 8, 2008, it reported that Dolph Lundgren had signed a contract with Insight Film Studios, a Canadian-based production company, to direct and star in Icarus, a "$6 million action thriller". Kirk Shaw, the president/executive producer of Insight Film, arranged for Lundgren to be flown into the country for dinner. After scouting filming locations and meeting with a "local scriptwriter", the "deal was sealed".

Samantha Ferris was cast as Kerr, a role originally written for a male actor. No alterations were made to the script, and Ferris described her character as being "kind [of] half guy, half girl".

Filming
Principal photography began in October, 2008. Shot entirely in Vancouver, British Columbia, Canada, filming was expected to last "about" five weeks, but reportedly wrapped after 18 days. According to Ferris, Lundgren had a "strong concept" and "vision" about how he wanted the film to be.

Release

Marketing
"First look" images from the film set emerged in early July, 2009. This coincided with the release of a teaser poster and teaser trailer later the same month. The official trailer was released a year later on July 23, 2010. In an effort to promote the film's DVD release, "two behind the scenes featurettes" were published beforehand. In them, Lundgren discusses his role as an actor and director, how he prepares for filming action scenes, and how he trains prior to performing any stunts.

Distribution
At the 2008 Cannes Film Market, CineTel Films acquired the international distribution rights to Icarus. According to the president and CEO of Cinetel Films, Paul Hertzberg, the "strong sales response Icarus received at [the Cannes Film Market reflected] the film's potential to be a hit among audiences around the world".

Home media
On August 16, 2010, the film was distributed on Blu-ray and DVD in the United Kingdom by Anchor Bay Films, followed by the United States on October 19.

Reception

Box office
On February 9, 2010, the worldwide premiere took place on Canadian television. This was followed by a limited theatrical release in a number of countries, including: the United States (on September 10, 2010), the United Arab Emirates (on October 28), Bahrain (on November 25), Oman (on December 2), and Kuwait (on December 16).
 Box office data is only available for the film's performance in the United Arab Emirates. In its first week of release in the UAE, the film debuted in sixth place and grossed $56,475 at the box office ($4,034 per screening). In the second week of release, the film dropped to nineteenth place and grossed a further $1,350 ($338 per screening). This was down 97 percent from the film's opening weekend. In its third and final week of release, gross profits went down a further 89 percent; the film dropped to twenty-sixth place and grossed $139 from one theater showing. By the end of its theatrical run, Icarus grossed a total of $72,643 at the UAE box office.

Critical response
Icarus received mixed reviews from film critics. Jason Rugaard, of Movie Mavericks, awarded three out of four stars, praising the action scenes and choreography. Even though the film "[earned] its R rating" through violence, he enjoyed the "quieter moments that allowed the actors to shine". According to him, Lundgren has "matured into a subtle actor with an intriguing screen presence", and his "confidence as a filmmaker" has enabled him to appear in "better productions than [would] normally be the case". He summarized his review by "warning" readers of the "mystifying and miscalculated final shot" that "nearly [destroyed] the entire film".

Eoin Friel, of The Action Elite, awarded three out of five stars. He praised the film's pace; as well as the violence, and described the acting as "decent". However, he criticized the film for being "poorly shot"; citing the "unnecessary" shaking of the camera and the "annoying" slow motion, which "ruins a lot of the action scenes". He "wasn't a fan" of the ending either, which - according to him - was "too abrupt" and was "left open for a potential sequel that will likely never happen".

David Brook, of Rowthree, awarded two and a half stars out of five. "Unpretentious trash" is what he expected, and the film delivered "for the most part". He felt the action scenes were "frantically (but not overly) edited" and enjoyable, and went as far as calling the film gory; "even for an action movie". He noted the film spends a "lot of time" showing Edward Genn and his family; "which doesn't really work at all". The dialogue was "borderline parody" and the acting was "atrocious". According to Brook, Icarus is "not a film to analyse, just one to sit back and enjoy with a beer or two and a bunch of [friends]".

Chris Wright, of What Culture, was very critical of the film.  He compared the opening titles to that of a "bad American tv show" and a "dodgy" video game, and felt the narration throughout was "mostly pointless and full of obvious, clichéd philosophies". For the "most part", Lundgren "spends his time mumbling" throughout the film "while pouting and posturing moodily through his scenes", with "no real change there either". Despite giving a primarily negative review, Wright stated the "overall quality of the [film] is very good for [a direct-to-dvd] release".

References

External links
 
 

2010 films
2010 direct-to-video films
2010 action thriller films
2010s Canadian films
2010s English-language films
2010s vigilante films
Canadian action thriller films
Canadian films about revenge
Canadian vigilante films
CineTel Films films
Direct-to-video action films
English-language Canadian films
Films about contract killing
Films about father–daughter relationships
Films about violence
Films directed by Dolph Lundgren
Films set in Los Angeles
Films set in Vancouver